Federal Highway 136D is a toll highway connecting the communities of Peñón and Texcoco in the State of Mexico.

History
Highway 136D opened on March 26, 1993.

The road is currently four lanes but is set to be widened to ten in conjunction with the New International Airport for Mexico City project; the road will be the primary point of access to the new airport. The project includes lanes that will go directly from the Mexico City metro to the airport without having to pay a toll.

References 

Mexican Federal Highways